Zion  is an unincorporated community in Pickens County, Alabama, United States.

References

Unincorporated communities in Pickens County, Alabama
Unincorporated communities in Alabama